is a Japanese manga series written and illustrated by Oreco Tachibana. It was serialized in Shogakukan's Ura Sunday website and MangaONE app from January 2018 to March 2022, with its chapters collected into sixteen tankōbon volumes. A television drama adaptation aired from July to September 2021.

Media

Manga
Written and illustrated by Oreco Tachibana, Promise Cinderella began serialization in Shogakukan's MangaONE app on January 1, 2018. It started in the Ura Sunday website a week later, on January 8. The series ended serialization on March 21, 2022. Sixteen tankōbon volumes have been released from June 2018 to August 2022. In North America, the series is licensed for a digital release by Comikey.

A spin-off manga titled Batsu Ichi Arasā Joshi to Danshi Kōkōsei began serialization on the Pixiv Comic service on June 11, 2018. The first tankōbon volume was released on February 12, 2019.

Volume list

Drama
In May 2021, a television drama adaptation was announced, starring Fumi Nikaido as Hayame Katsuragi. It was directed Shōsuke Murakami, Junichi Tsuzuki, and Shinichi Kitabō, based on a script written by Kazunao Furuya. Fumi Hashimoto and Daichi Hisamatsu served as producers, while Yutaka Yamada composed the music. The ten-episode series aired on TBS from July 13 to September 14, 2021. LiSA performed the theme song "Hadashi no Step". Viki has licensed the series in North America.

Cinderella Complex, a spin-off drama series featuring an original story, was released on the Japanese streaming service Paravi during the airing of the main drama adaptation.

Reception
In 2018, Promise Cinderella ranked 12th in the fourth Next Manga Awards in the web manga category. In 2020, the series was nominated in the 66th Shogakukan Manga Awards in the general category.

References

External links
  
 

2021 Japanese television series debuts
2021 Japanese television series endings
Japanese webcomics
Manga adapted into television series
Romantic comedy anime and manga
Shogakukan manga
Shōjo manga
Shōnen manga
TBS Television (Japan) dramas
Webcomics in print